Alexander Barrow I (March 27, 1801 – December 29, 1846) was a slave owner, lawyer and United States Senator from Louisiana. He was a member of the Whig Party. He was the half-brother of Washington Barrow, sharing the same father.

Born near Nashville, Tennessee, to Willie Barrow and his first wife Jane Green, Barrow attended the United States Military Academy in West Point, New York, from 1816 to 1818. Then he studied law and was admitted to the bar, in 1822, commencing practice in Nashville.

Soon afterward he relocated to Feliciana Parish, Louisiana, where he continued to practice law. Later he abandoned his legal career to become a planter.

Eventually, Alexander Barrow became involved in politics and was elected to the Louisiana House of Representatives, where he served for several years. While in state office, he denounced bans on slave imports, and said that the state's "wealth and property" were attributable "fair and fully upon the labor of slaves."

In 1840 Barrow was elected a Whig to the United States Senate, serving from 1841 until his death. There he was Chairman of the Committee on Public Buildings and Grounds during the 27th Congress and of the Committee on the Militia during the 27th and 28th Congresses. According to longtime Washington journalist Benjamin Perley Poore, Barrow was "the handsomest man in the Senate."

Senator Barrow died in Baltimore, Maryland, on December 29, 1846. His remains were interred in the family cemetery on Afton Villa slave plantation, near Bayou Sara, Louisiana.

Alexander and Mary Ann Barrow had three children, Alexander II, Willie Micajah, and Jane.

See also

List of United States Congress members who died in office (1790–1899)
Robert Ruffin Barrow

References

Information of Barrow and his family  <--broken link 26 Apr 2015.

External links

1801 births
1846 deaths
Politicians from Nashville, Tennessee
Whig Party United States senators from Louisiana
Members of the Louisiana House of Representatives
Louisiana Whigs
Louisiana lawyers
Tennessee lawyers
Farmers from Louisiana
American planters
American lawyers admitted to the practice of law by reading law
19th-century American lawyers